Abraham Jonas may refer to:

Abraham Jonas (politician) (1801–1864), American politician
Abraham Jonas (rugby league) (1890–1933), Australian rugby league player

See also
Abraham Jones (disambiguation)